It Came from the Desert is a 1989 action-adventure game by Cinemaware. It was originally released for the Amiga, but later ported to MS-DOS, as well as released in distinctly different forms to consoles. The TurboGrafx-16 release is distinctly different from the computer versions, in terms of gameplay and presentation. An expansion set Antheads: It Came from the Desert II was released in 1990.

The game is inspired by dozens of 1950s monster movies especially the 1954 mutant-ant classic Them!, with the title referencing the 1953 horror film, It Came from Outer Space. The game is a non-linear combination of dialogue boxes and several types of action scenes, typical of contemporary Cinemaware releases.

Premise
The player assumes the role of Dr. Greg Bradley who comes to remote Lizard Breath, California on June 1, 1951. As a geologist, he wants to study a meteor crash site somewhere in the desert south-west of the small town. Early in the game he learns that the radiation of the meteor has enlarged a local ant population to an enormous size, however few take his observations seriously. Worried that the ants will soon mate and spread, he must work against a ticking clock and devise a plan to stop the ants from terrorizing the world. In order to succeed the player must visit many locations ranging from mines, farms, a pub, an airfield, a local radio station and others to find evidence of the ants, then convince townsfolk and authorities of impending doom. At the same time the player must contain the ant infestation.

Only in using every resource available, from workers to the tanks and fighter jets of the National Guard, will the player be able to take the fight to the giant ants.

Mechanically, It Came From the Desert can be considered real-time. Waiting, sleeping (at home or in a hospital bed) and driving around consumes time. As it turns out, the player has a fixed amount of in-game days (15 days, ending with June 15) to succeed. If Bradley fails by this date, the ants will mate and spread, which results in a gloomy ending. To reach a good ending, the player must locate the ant colony and kill the queen ant.

Losing, duration, and replays
The player must replay the game, and take information into account that was learned in previous games, and then optimize a path ("when to be where") to stop the ants. Typically, the player cannot win the game in one play-through and a conventional game over does not exist. Instead, when Dr. Bradley gets "killed" he awakes in hospital and time jumps forward as a penalty to reflect the time that has passed spending in bed. Alternatively, the player can try to avoid the penalty by succeeding in a hospital escape minigame, which also acts as a comic relief.

The duration of one play-through can be about one hour. It will vary due to thinking, exploring and time spent with reading, time wasted ("skipped") from driving around and other factors. Early stages involve more dialogue and collecting clues, later it is more action-oriented; especially when the player succeeds in convincing the authorities to declare an emergency (this can be as early as the 6th day if the player collects four pieces of ant evidence, or as late as the 10th day if the player fails to collect all four pieces). Dr. Bradley's actions and decisions in the dialogue have an influence on the characters, and as a result, on the story, including (at least) two endings.

Gameplay
It Came From the Desert utilizes different gameplay types, a hallmark of Cinemaware games. An "adventure" mode provides the overall structure and advances the plot. A main "action" mode is used to combat and defeat the ants. A collection of minigames cover special aspects of the narrative.

Adventure
The adventure mode is similar to a visual novel or adventure game (like Phoenix Wright) and provides the overall structure, in which everything else is embedded. Except selecting the location in the overview, the game world is viewed from a first-person perspective. It consists of:
Game world map: the player can select discrete locations and can read how long it would take to drive there. Once a location was selected, the time jumps forward to the time of arrival. On occasion the trip is interrupted by a minigame where a gang of greasers challenge Dr. Bradley to a game of chicken. 
Locations: once arrived at the desired location, the game switches to a first-person perspective typically showing a static (or scarcely animated) background. A box comes up narrating Dr. Bradley's thoughts. 
Interview: depending on location and time of the day, a character poses in the foreground whom Dr. Bradley can interview. These dialogues take into account the evidence Dr. Bradley has collected so far and advance the plot. Sometimes he has options how to respond, and additional options.
Options: some locations and state of the game give Dr. Bradley additional options, like examining evidence, making phone calls, or going to sleep. For example, Dr. Bradley can sleep at his residence and set the alarm clock. An inventory system does not exist. Instead evidence, knowledge and clues are handled with the standard options accessible at each location. 
Minigames: on location, a single ant can appear, causing the game to switch to the "shooting minigame". One rare occasions, a character can brandish a knife, and the game switches to the "knife-fight minigame". A fire can break out, and the "fire-extinguishing minigame" starts. Most commonly, the game switches over to "action" part of the game.
As typical for adventure games, progress is complicated by various smaller story arcs which Dr. Bradley can resolve. One of them involves a mysterious "Neptune" secret society and a murder case. There is also a romance plot. The nonlinear narrative comes about as it depends which location Dr. Bradley visits at what time, and whether he meets certain characters and whether he advances their story in time. The plot also involves making decisions which characters to meet, and support.

Action
At certain places or due to events, the game world switches into a top-down perspective and the player assumes control of Dr. Bradley to navigate him around in a finer detail (in the adventure mode he can only drive to discrete locations shown by name on the overview). The entire game world is reproduced from this perspective, however earlier in the game only a smaller section is visible and relevant.

It is commonly triggered when several ants are approaching, while the player is in the "adventure" mode. The player must move Dr. Bradley away and escape from the ants which try to encircle him.

Weapons and vehicles
Dr. Bradley can throw grenades to defend himself. Later in the game, he has other weapons at his disposal, such as dynamite and a flame thrower. Depending on location, Dr. Bradley can also drive vehicles (such as a tank), fly a plane and spray pesticides, and call in a jet airstrike in the emergency phase.

Good ending
In the later part of the game, the player must locate and descend into the ant colony in order to place an explosive near the queen ant and thereby conclude the story with a "good ending".

Minigames
It Came from the Desert features several minigames, some of which are random in occurrence - such as chicken and shooting which randomly occur when driving or exploring respectively, or integral to the game, such as Hospital, where early escape saves lost time.
Shooting: in this minigame that employs the same first-person-perspective as the "adventure" part, Dr. Bradley can shoot his sidearm at an approaching ant. The ant is killed by shooting off both its antennae. As the minigame uses the same scenery, it is seamlessly integrated into the adventure mode.  The shooting minigame also appears as a dream sequence.
Fire-Extinguishing: there are scenes in which the player must wield an extinguisher to quench a fire. The mechanics are fairly similar to the shooting minigame.
Chicken: (seemingly) at random times when Dr. Bradley drives to one location, he must succeed at a game of chicken against a local gang of greasers. The minigame is viewed from inside the car. The player's objective is to steer the car head-on into the approaching car of the gang members, which causes them to evade off-road in the last moment. The player can manoeuvre their vehicle off the road as well, which results in a crash (then their car needs repairs and counts as another time penalty). However, if the greasers do not evade, Dr. Bradley will also crash and in addition is penalized with waking up in hospital. The greasers can be convinced to leave Dr. Bradley alone.
Hospital: when Dr. Bradley fails in any action sequence, he will wake up in a hospital bed and has to stay there for at least a night, imposing a time penalty on the player. The player can opt to escape, when the game switches into a top-down perspective within the hospital. Dr. Bradley is chased by nurses and physicians, can hide in empty beds, and drive a wheel-chair to make his escape. Doing so successfully, cuts down the time-penalty otherwise imposed on him. 
Knife-Fight: in some rare encounters, an interviewee during the adventuring part brandishes a knife. Two men, Dr. Bradley and the opponent are shown in a knife-duel from above. Objective is to evade the stabs of the opponent and attack when exposed. As usual, losing the knife-fight puts Dr. Bradley into the hospital.

Release
It Came From the Desert was originally released for the Amiga in 1989 and then was ported to several other popular systems of the era. In early 1991, Cinemaware released a version for MS-DOS (ported by Level 9 Computing in a final attempt to stay in business before they ceased operations in June of that year). This version was, apart from minor palette differences, identical to the original.

A Sega Genesis/Mega Drive version was to be released in 1990, but was cancelled. It is an overhead shooter with the main protagonist running around on foot, although it features more free roaming gameplay than traditional scrolling shooters. Among the differences in play mechanics, the Sega version allowed the player to create powerups that were fashioned by collecting machinery pieces and joining them together in different combinations. The storyline also differs from the game, instead casting the player not as the scientist from the original but as a teenage pest control worker known as Buzz who makes a variety of improvisational weapons with various materials combined with his pest control equipment. Prior to cancellation, former Black Pearl Software programmer Matt Harmon stated that the Genesis/Mega Drive version was 99% complete. Although the Sega version was never actually offered for sale, it was distributed as a ROM image (for use with console emulators) from the Cinemaware website after the turn of the 21st century. Despite the similarity of camera perspective, the Sega version did not appear to reuse any of the graphical elements created for use in the computer-based versions. In 2014 Cinemaware teamed up with Pier Solar developer WaterMelon to develop a cartridge version called Extended Cut with new cutscenes, endings, a new intro sequence and "additional gameplay elements". As of April 2016, the game still has not been released.

The game and its expansion were released on Steam as part of a Cinemaware Anthology collection.

TurboGrafx-CD
The TurboGrafx-CD version designed and directed by David Riordan was released in 1991. It is a CD-ROM based game that makes use of full motion video with recorded sequences of live actors. There are also action sequences that use drawn graphical elements (not captured, as seen in games such as Mean Streets by Access Software). The side-scrolling action sequence consists of the player battling ants in tunnels. The TurboGrafx-CD version did reuse the graphical elements from the computer version for the overhead battle sequences, but not for any of the character conversation segments. The storyline and characters were dramatically changed; the player character is no longer a spry scientist from the city visiting the countryside, but a local teenage biker punk named Buzz Lincoln who is somehow immune to the ant queen's mind control and begins a nearly hopeless counterattack against her hordes.

Reception
In the July 1990 edition of Games International (Issue 16), John Scott commented "Right from the opening sequence you know that this is something special." He noted the replayability of the game, noting that "There is no way that you will be able to discover all the subplots in one game, and this adds to the lasting appeal of the game." And he also lauded the technical aspects of the game, calling the graphics "first rate", and the sound "the best I've ever come across in any game." He concluded by rating both gameplay and graphics an excellent 9 out of 10. Scott also reviewed the sequel Antheads, and found that it was too similar to the original game, noting "More varied graphics and a complete new sountrack would have been nice." However, Scott admitted that the low purchase price for what was essentially an add-on chapter made it a worthwhile purchase. 

Computer Gaming World called It Came from the Desert "one of the most enjoyable programs yet to emerge from Cinemaware ... a very playable and compelling game with many enjoyable hours to be experienced". Antheads won game of the year honors from Computer & Video Games magazine.

In 1991, PC Format declared It Came from the Desert one of the 50 best computer games ever. The editors wrote that "a classic '50s B-movie plot combined with some lovely graphics make this a fun game".

Expansion pack

It Came from the Desert was followed by a 1990 expansion pack called Antheads: It Came from the Desert II (known in North America as It Came from the Desert II) that required the player to already own the main game. The sequel was directed and designed by David Riordan and was available on store shelves in Europe and via mail order in North America.

Plot summary
The game takes place five years after It Came from the Desert in January 1956 and expands on the possible second Ant Queen mentioned in the first game's ending. The player character is Brick Nash, a war veteran and now working as a truck driver who has stolen a detonator for an atomic bomb because his younger brother Andy is a tester for the weapon. Nash fears that the Army's then-ignorance of radiation will cause his brother and other testers to die. Nash must find evidence that will prove radiation is fatal, as well as help the town fend off the new ant army.

Brick Nash is an ex-fighter pilot who has recently returned from the Korean war, responding to a warning of thousands of potential deaths due to atomic testing in the desert outside the town of Lizard Breath.

Whereas the protagonist of the first game – Dr. Greg Bradley – was known to the people of Lizard Breath who were willing to help him, Nash is a stranger to them. Townspeople also transform into ants in front of Nash.

Reception

In the July 1990 edition of Games International (Issue 16), John Scott found that it was too similar to the original game, noting "More varied graphics and a complete new sountrack would have been nice." However, Scott admitted that the low purchase price for what was essentially an add-on chapter made it a worthwhile purchase. He concluded by rating both gameplay and graphics an excellent 9 out of 10.

Mark Patterson from CU Amiga (May, 1990) rated the game at 95% and recommended Antheads to anyone who owned It Came from the Desert, calling it "One of the best sequels to date."

Gary Whitta from The One (Jun, 1990) rated the game at 91% and noted that "Antheads doesn't radically change It Came from the Desert. What you get is the next episode in the story – effectively the same game built around a new mystery, with new puzzles to solve and the odd gameplay tweak. But this is no bad thing, as it's precisely what Desert needed – there's no need to change the core gameplay drastically, as it works brilliantly already."

Phil South form ACE (Advanced Computer Entertainment) (Jun, 1990) declared that Antheads is "a better game than the original in my view, if only for the scary ant transformation sequence", and felt that people who had not even played the original game would enjoy it: "If anything it's an incentive to buy the original, just to play this version as well."

The Games Machine (Jun, 1990) said that "If you liked the original, you'll love this cos it's more of the same."

Zzap!64 praised the story and declared that the gameplay was "different enough to justify the price".

Reviews
 ASM (Aktueller Software Markt)
 Datormagazin
 Power Play
 Amiga Joker
 Amiga Action #9 (Jun 1990)

Legacy
It Came From the Desert was parodied in a Space Quest IV reference: the player can find the box of the "Enemaware" game It came for Dessert in a store, where the woman holds a cake, and a fat man replaces the ant.
An extensive spinoff appeared in the 1996 game Command & Conquer: Red Alert as four secret missions named "It came from Red Alert," where the player combats giant ants.
Cinemaware and Roger! Pictures started in 2015 to create the film version of the game. The film has been directed by Marko Mäkilaakso. The movie was filmed in Almería (Spain) in the autumn of 2016, in the Tabernas Desert and in Rodalquilar.
It Returned to the Desert is a spiritual successor which is scheluded for release on February 15, 2023 for the Windows PCs.

References

External links
 
 It Came from the Desert at the Hall of Light
 

1989 video games
Action-adventure games
Amiga games
Cancelled Sega Genesis games
Cinemaware games
DOS games
1980s horror video games
Level 9 Computing games
Shooter video games
Single-player video games
TurboGrafx-CD games
Video games about ants
Video games about insects
Video games developed in the United States
Video games set in California
Video games set in the 1950s
Video games set in the United States
Video games with expansion packs